Peter Crotty (16 September 1925 – 1 June 2003) was an Irish boxer. He competed in the men's welterweight event at the 1952 Summer Olympics.

References

1925 births
2003 deaths
Irish male boxers
Olympic boxers of Ireland
Boxers at the 1952 Summer Olympics
People from Dungarvan
Welterweight boxers